The 2008–09 Northwestern Wildcats men's basketball team represented Northwestern University in the 2008–09 college basketball season. This was head coach Bill Carmody's ninth season at the Northwestern. The Wildcats are members of the Big Ten Conference and played their home games at Welsh-Ryan Arena. They finished the season 17–14, 8–10 in Big Ten play, lost in the first round of the 2009 Big Ten Conference men's basketball tournament and were invited to the 2009 National Invitation Tournament where they lost in the first round to the University of Tulsa.  Northwestern matched their school record for most wins in a season and recorded their first post-season appearance since 1999.

Schedule and results

|-
!colspan=8| Regular season

|-
!colspan=8| Big Ten tournament

|-
!colspan=8|NIT

References

Northwestern Wildcats
Northwestern
Northwestern Wildcats men's basketball seasons
Northwestern Wild
Northwestern Wild